Guardiola may refer to:

Plants

 Guardiola (plant), a genus of plants in the family Asteraceae

Places

 Guardiola de Berguedà, municipality in Catalonia
 Sant Salvador de Guardiola, previously Guardiola de Bages, a municipality in Catalonia
 Guardiola, a village in the municipality of Bassella, Catalonia
 Guardiola de Font-rubí, capital of the municipality of Font-rubí, Catalonia

People

 Gedeón Guardiola (born 1984), Spanish handballer
 Illich Guardiola (born 1972), American actor
 Isaías Guardiola (born 1984), Spanish handballer
 Jorge Guardiola (born 1963), Spanish sports shooter
 José Guardiola (actor) (1921–1988), Spanish actor
 José Guardiola (1930–2012), Spanish singer
 José Santos Guardiola (1816–1862), president of Honduras
 Pep (Josep) Guardiola (born 1971), Spanish footballer and coach
 Sergi Guardiola (born 1991), Spanish footballer
 Simó de Guardiola y Hortoneda (fl. 1827–1851), Bishop of Urgell
 Thierry Guardiola (born 1971), French tennis player